Haplogroup L1 is a human mitochondrial DNA (mtDNA) haplogroup. It is most common in Central Africa and West Africa.
It diverged from L1-6 at about 140,000 years ago ( 95% CI).
Its emergence is associated with the early peopling of Africa by anatomically modern humans during the Eemian, and it is now mostly found in African pygmies.

Distribution
Haplogroup L1 is found most commonly in Central Africa and West Africa. It reaches its highest frequency among the Mbenga Pygmies.
It is likely that it was formerly more widespread, and was constrained to its current area as a result of the Bantu migration (which is largely associated with haplogroup L2).
Haplogroup L1 has been observed in specimens from the island cemetery in Kulubnarti, Sudan, which date from the Early Christian period (AD 550–800).
An ancient Beaker culture individual at the Camino de las Yeseras in Spain (San Fernando de Henares, Madrid; [I4245 / RISE695] F) has also been found to carry the L1b1a mitochondrial haplogroup.

Phylogeny

L1 has two branches, L1c and L1b (the formerly named haplogroups L1d, L1k, L1a, L1f have been re-classified into haplogroup L0, as L0d, L0k, L0a, L0f; L1e as L5).

L1c
Haplogroup L1c emerged at about 85 kya. It reaches its highest frequencies in West and Central Africa, notably among the Mbenga Pygmy peoples. (see map). Among the Mbenga, it is carried by 100% of Ba-Kola, 97% of Ba-Benzélé, and 77% of Biaka. Other populations in which L1c is particularly prevalent include the Bedzan (Tikar) people (100%), Baka people from Gabon (97%) and Cameroon (90%), the Bakoya (97%), and the Ba-Bongo (82%). Common also in São Tomé (20%) and Angola (16–24%).

Phylogeny: 

L1c
L1c1'2'4'6
L1c1
L1c1a
L1c1a1
L1c1a1a
L1c1a1a1
L1c1a1a1a
L1c1a1a1b
L1c1a1a1b1
L1c1a1a2
L1c1a1b
L1c1a2
L1c1a2a
L1c1a2a1
L1c1a2a2
L1c1a2b
L1c1a2c
L1c1b'c'd
L1c1b
L1c1c'd
L1c1c
L1c1d
L1c2'4
L1c2
L1c2a
L1c2a1
L1c2a1a
L1c2a1b
L1c2a2
L1c2b
L1c2b1
L1c2b2
L1c4
L1c4a
L1c4b
L1c6
L1c3
L1c3a
L1c3a1
L1c3a1a
L1c3b'c
L1c3b
L1c3b1
L1c3b1a
L1c3b1b
L1c3b2
L1c3c

L1b
Haplogroup L1b is much more recent, dated at about 10 kya. It is frequent in West Africa. It has also been found in Mozambique (1%), Ethiopia (2%), Egypt (1%), the Nile Valley (4%), Kung (1%), Cape Verde (8%), Senegal (17–20%), Niger/Nigeria (15%), Guinea Bissau (11%), Morocco (4–5%), and Algeria (1–2%).

Phylogeny: 
L1b
L1b1
L1b1a
L1b1a1'4
L1b1a1
L1b1a4
L1b1a2
L1b1a2a
189
L1b1a3
L1b1a3a
L1b1a3a1
L1b1a5
L1b1a6
L1b1b7

See also 

Genealogical DNA test
Genetic genealogy
Human mitochondrial genetics
Population genetics
Human mitochondrial DNA haplogroups

References

Notes

External links 
 PhyloTree.org - mtDNA subtree L, van Oven & Kayser M. 2009.
Spread of Haplogroup L1, from National Geographic
African Haplogroup L mtDNA Sequences Show Violations of Clock-like Evolution
Ian Logan's Haplogroup L1b. 
Ian Logan's Haplogroup L1c.
 L1 YFull MTree 1.02.00 (under construction)

L1